Pelargonium vein clearing virus (PVCV) is a plant pathogenic virus of the family Rhabdoviridae.

External links
ICTVdB - The Universal Virus Database: Pelargonium vein clearing virus
Family Groups - The Baltimore Method

Cytorhabdoviruses
Viral plant pathogens and diseases